The Sichongxi Hot Spring is a hot spring in Checheng Township, Pingtung County, Taiwan.

Geology
The hot spring is located at the Sichong riverbank. The hot spring water is of alkaline type and rich in sodium carbonate. The area around the hot spring was designed with Japanese architecture style.

Transportation
The hot spring is accessible by bus from Pingtung Station of Taiwan Railways.

See also
 List of tourist attractions in Taiwan
 Taiwanese hot springs

References

Hot springs of Taiwan
Tourist attractions in Pingtung County